Dato' Siti Nurhaliza Unplugged 2015 was a concert by Malaysian recording artist, Siti Nurhaliza. It was held on 7 April 2015 at Istana Budaya and marked her twentieth year in the Malaysian music industry. Almost all the songs performed during this one-night concert were from her own repertoire, covering her hits and popular songs from the beginning of her career to more recent ones.

Throughout the two-hour show, Siti performed almost thirty songs and more than twenty were composed and arranged into ten medleys. The concert also served as a platform for Siti to perform every song from her 2014 album, Fragmen. The concert was a commercial success; despite the fact that the concert was realised in less than two weeks, tickets to the concert sold out days prior to the concert night. The concert also received positive feedback and critical acclaim by critics who praised Siti's vocal performance even after being in the industry for more than twenty years.

Background and development

The realisation and execution of the show took around two weeks. The first advertisement for the show happened on 20 March when Siti's personal assistant revealed on her Facebook account that the special concert would be held on 7 April to mark Siti's twenty years in the music industry. Few snippets of Siti training for the show were also shared by Siti on her personal Instagram account. Siti openly admitted that these were fans who were angry and voiced out their dissatisfaction and sadness because they were unable to attend the concert due to the limited number of days, but it cannot be avoided since the concert was created in a short amount of time. Although the concert was planned and organised in about two weeks, all the tickets for the concert sold out days before the show.

Most of the songs performed at the concert were taken from Siti's pop albums, with other songs added to give the show some variations. However, more focus were given to the songs that are included in Fragmen, one of her most recent pop albums to date.

Being an unplugged concert, the vocal side of the performance was given more preparation since the whole set list was performed acoustically. Throughout the set list, only six musicians and four dancers were employed to accompany her, with Aubrey Suwito in charged of composing and arranging the music for the concert. Siti was accompanied by Awi Rafael, Datuk Adnan Abu Hassan and Faizal Tahir for parts of the concert where the songs that were composed and written by them.

Performances

Fashion and stage
Keeping up with its minimal concert setting, Siti only changed her wardrobe twice. Both of her outfits were designed by Rizman Ruzaini.

Concert synopsis

The concert began at 8.40 p.m. with Siti performing "Membunuh Benci" while accompanied by Aubrey Suwito on piano, who was the musical director for the concert. This was followed by the first medley of the night, composed of the first two upbeat songs of the night, "Mahligai Asmara" and "Satu Cinta Dua Jiwa" where she started to dance while singing. Between the performances, she shared some of her past experiences including when she first started singing professionally after winning 1995 Bintang Hiburan Minggu Ini (Bintang HMI) at the age of 16. She revealed that "Jawapan di Persimpangan", the first track from her debut album was the first song she recorded when she was under the tutelage of Datuk Adnan Abu Hassan. She resumed her performance by performing the second medley of the night composed of "Jawapan di Persimpangan", "Purnama Merindu" and "Diari Hatimu" and followed by another medley composed of "Aku Cinta Padamu" and "Biarlah Rahsia". For the next performance she invited Awi Rafael, the composer of "Mula dan Akhir," to accompany her on guitar while she sang the tune that he composed for her most recent album, Fragmen.

Siti returned to upbeat songs in a medley of "Intrig Cinta" and "Tanpa Kalian". Prior to the performance of these two songs, she invited a fan from Singapore to join her on the stage. She went performed another medley of her ballads, "Usah Diragui", "Wajah Kekasih" and "Kau Kekasihku". Present in the audience was also invited guests Tun Dr. Mahathir Mohamad, former Prime Minister of Malaysia with his wife, Tun Dr. Siti Hasmah Mohamad Ali. Siti reminisced the moment when she was taken from Subang airport after arriving from Shanghai straight to Langkawi by a helicopter to perform for an event that was attended by Tun Dr. Mahathir Mohamad. She was excited she was to meet Tun Dr. Mahathir Mohamad (who was still a prime minister at the time) and break the news personally to him that she just won the Gold Award from the Asia New Singer Competition in Shanghai in 1999.

In the second half of the concert, Siti invited Faizal Tahir to accompany her on guitar while she sang "Aku" and "Warna Dunia", the former of which was composed by Faizal for Fragmen. Later she also invited Datuk Adnan Abu Hassan to accompany her on piano to the songs that were written and composed by him, "Jerat Percintaan" and "Gelora Asmara". During the performance she recalled when Adnan helped her when was beginning her career as a singer. She told the audience, "Abang D (Adnan) is among the individuals that is responsible of taking me into this industry, I actually once stayed at his house back when I was becoming an artist. At the time, he just got married and he is yet to have any children, so I took shelter in an empty room inside his house." She resumed her performance with another three medleys. The first one is a medley of cover songs, "Epilog Cinta dari Bromley" by Sohaimi Mior Hassan and "Suratan Atau Kebetulan" by Kenny, Remy and Martin, followed by a medley of her songs again which was a medley of "Engkau Bagaikan Permata" and "Cahaya Seribu Liku". The final medley was three songs from Fragmen written by Indonesian songwriters and composers — "Sanubari", "Terbaik Bagimu" and "Kau Sangat Bererti". She finished the show by performing all the songs from Fragmen that were released as singles including "Jaga Dia Untukku", "Lebih Indah" and "Seluruh Cinta". Originally a duet, this concert marked the first solo performance of "Seluruh Cinta".

Critical response

Despite the short planning and execution time for the concert, it received positive responses from music critics. Most reviewers agreed that despite the simplistic nature of the acoustic concert, her vocals was the best part of the concert. Izzat Mohd Anuar from MyNewsHub commented on this fact as "Opting to appear simplistic in term of her dresses and stage decorations, Siti does not compromise from her vocals side where she is still able to show her 'fangs' (vocals) that are still potent and unchanged." One reviewer from Kosmo! also shared the same sentiment. The reviewer commented, "For this concert, in accordance to its acoustic theme, Siti does not go over the top. [...] But, the most important fact that the audience should know is how she spellbinds the audience for more than two hours just by listening to her singing her selection of hits that are well-kept in her art (music) portfolio."

Siti's vocals referred as "merdu" (sweet) by Syanty Octavia Amry of Harian Metro, Dhiya Aizat of Tonton Extra, Nurfarhana Mohamed of Utusan Online and Shazryn Mohd. Faizal of The Rakyat Post. Nina Farzuin Md Sharom of Sinar Harian praised Siti's vocal performance even after more than twenty years being in the industry. She wrote, "Even after twenty years have passed, but the sweetness of this singer's voice is still able to make all the audience captivated.", an opinion which is also shared by Shazryn of The Rakyat Post. Che'AZ, reviewer from the English version of The Rakyat Post commented, "Siti not only drowned her audience with her powerful vocals, she also proved to them that she is truly in a league of her own by mesmerising the entire crowd with her melodious arrangements."

A number of reviewers also agree that one of the most poignant moments of the concert was when Siti invited her former mentor, Datuk Adnan Abu Hassan to the stage to accompany her on piano while she is belting songs of his creation - "Jerat Percintaan" and "Gelora Asmara". Shazryn Mohd. Faizal of The Rakyat Post called the moment of the performance as "peak of the concert" and "heart-touching", while reviewer from Murai called it as "heart-wrenching". The reviewer further commented, "Even though Datuk Adnan's health condition is still unstable and it was said he's having a stroke, his spirit to be with Siti Nurhaliza is strong although he had to be helped to get on the stage. That slot managed to make the audience in the hall to feel wistful and melancholic, but with Adnan's fingers playing the piano is proving that he is still able to perform and further beautify "Konsert Unplugged Siti Nurhaliza"."

Critics have noted that Siti has become more comfortable with her communication and interaction skills when she is on the stage, a fact which Siti addressed during the concert. She admitted that during her early years, she was afraid to speak with the media. Rosli Manah of Mangga Online whom Siti personally thanked for being the first journalist to interview her during her early years also noted the same fact. Rosli commented, "I did not expect that I was the first journalist to interview Siti at that time. I'm not asking to be remembered, but Siti is a person who remembers others' deeds and [is] down-to-earth. The utmost important is that she is a person who always tries to improve herself. For me, this is what has brought [her] to her success."

Most reviewers and critics agreed that the one-day concert was a success. Reviewer from Kosmo! concluded the review with, "Ah, Datuk [sic: Dato'] Siti Nurhaliza. No matter how hard we try to undermine or disprove Siti's abilities, with that much hardness this 36 year old woman will continue to prove that she is indeed the best star of the stage for us all."

Commercial performance
Tickets for the concert were made available for online purchase though the concert's official online vendor, AirAsiaRedTix.com. The tickets were also sold on selected outlets for manual pick-ups. Although the concert was planned and executed in two weeks, tickets that were priced from RM 78 to RM 518 and sold in late March. They were sold out at least three days before the day of the concert.

Set list
 "Membunuh Benci"
 First Medley
 "Mahligai Asmara"
 "Satu Cinta Dua Jiwa"
 Second Medley
 "Jawapan di Persimpangan"
 "Purnama Merindu"
 "Diari Hatimu"
 Third Medley
 "Aku Cinta Padamu"
 "Biarlah Rahsia"
 "Mula dan Akhir"
 Fourth Medley
 "Intrig Cinta"
 "Tanpa Kalian"
 Fifth Medley
 "Usah Diragui"
 "Wajah Kekasih"
 "Kau Kekasihku"
 Sixth Medley
 "Aku"
 "Warna Dunia"
 Seventh Medley
 "Jerat Percintaan"
 "Gelora Asmara"
 Eighth Medley
 "Epilog Cinta dari Bromley"
 "Suratan Atau Kebetulan"
 Ninth Medley
 "Engkau Bagaikan Permata"
 "Cahaya Seribu Liku"
 Tenth Medley
 "Sanubari"
 "Terbaik Bagimu"
 "Kau Sangat Bererti"
 "Jaga Dia Untukku"
 "Lebih Indah"
 "Seluruh Cinta" (Encore)

Source —

Personnel
Credits adapted from Unplugged booklet liner notes.

Main concert 

 Adzwa - dance instructor
 Alud @ Khairul Azmir Abdul Hamid - concert manager, concert administrator
 Aniza - dancer
 Aubrey Suwito - musical director, post production, arrangement, piano
 Awi Rafael - guest artist
 Chandelier Trust Lighting Collection - sponsor
 Dato' Adnan Abu Hassan - guest artist
 Dato' Mohamed Juhari Shaarani - adviser
 Dato' Siti Nurhaliza - executive producer, vocals
 Derrick Siow - drums
 Fadzliana - dancer
 Faizal Tahir - guest artist
 Fara Wahida - dancer
 Firdaus Dalip - monitor engineer
 'Fly' Halizor Hussein - electric bass, upright bass
 Joel Voo - acoustic guitar
 Juanita - background vocals
 Lentera Creative Home - sponsor
 Lim Jae Sern - violin
 Marina - dancer
 Miela @ Norfazilah Abu Seman - management/production
 Mohd Azli Othman - compere
 Mohd Rafi Shafie - acoustic guitar
 Moke Printing - sponsor
 Nur Iman @ Aiman - production manager
 Nurul Shuhada - dancer
 Nurul Shukor - make-up artist
 Ozlan Othman - lighting director
 Paradigm Studio - photography
 Rizman Ruzaini - wardrobe designer, sponsor
 Rozi Abdul Razak - idea, concept, script, coordinator
 Shaun Paiva - assistant sound engineer/recording, 
 Siti Norsaida Tarudin - management/production
 Steve Thornton - percussion
 Sunil Kumar - sound engineer/recording, mixing
 Syaiful Rasyidi @ Ad - technical director
 Widy - background vocals
 Zaramiz Sdn. Bhd. - sponsor

Istana Budaya workforce 
Production

 Mohd Azli Othman - production
 Mohd Ferdaus Hassan - production
 Rozita Ismail - production
 Suhaimi Abdul Rahim - production

Management

 Azhar Mohamad - management
 Harttzery Nazry Hatta - management
 Kamarulanuar Ismail - management
 M Ramlee Hj Ismail - management
 Mohd Ridhuan Wan Mohd Zin - management
 Mohd Yusoff Bokhri - management

Audiovisual unit

 Hakimi Mohd Zain - audiovisual unit
 Jafri Hasan - audiovisual unit
 Mohamad Yusri Zain - audiovisual unit
 Mohd Zunohan Md Noor - audiovisual unit
 Mohd Zul'amri Amran - audiovisual unit
 Muhamad Fadzli Ramli - audiovisual unit

Stage management

 Anuar Mohamad Kassim - stage management
 Azrulnizam Aziz - stage management
 Barat Anak Echan - stage management
 Mohd Anuar Zakaria - stage management
 Mohd Sujak Othman - stage management
 Mohd Sufri Mohamad - stage management
 Sha'ari Hashin - stage management
 Yuzaidi Md Yusuf - stage management

Art and design

 Abdul Razak Abdol Rahim - art and design
 Mohd Azali Idris - art and design
 Mohd Khairul Adnan Khalid - art and design
 Rudy Efendy Jammakhir - art and design
 Sazali Ismail - art and design

Technical

 Ahmad Ruzaini Bin Mohd Sharif
 Ahmad Tarmizi Muhammad
 Amir Bin Abu
 Amir Husni Bin Hamidun
 Azhari Bin Abdul Rashid
 Azli Bin Baharuddin
 Azri Bin Seman
 Azzazial Bin Shuib
 Fareez Bin Sadikon
 Ilmi Bin Cek Hamid
 Ismail B. Mohammad
 Khairul Aizat Bin Alias
 Khairul Anuar Bin Jaafar
 Maharini Binti Bidin
 Mat Nuri Bin Mat Ali
 Mohammad Fairolnizam Bin Ali Othman
 Mohammad Faizal Bin Hj. Hamid
 Mohammed Herman Bin Majid
 Mohd Alizar Bin Sulaiman
 Mohd Fyrulnizam Bin Mohd Yusof
 Mohd Halimi Bin Hassan
 Mohd Nizam Abu Bakar
 Mohd Nizam B. Bakar
 Mohd Rizal Bin Johari @ Razak
 Mohd Yusoff Bin Kassim
 Muhammad Zaki Bin Abu Samah
 Nik Mohd Fadzir Bin Nik Ismail
 Osmar Bin Fariez
 Salleh Bin Muhammad
 Suzahani Bin Shuib
 Tines Kumar A/L Murugasu
 Wan Ayubee B. Wan Razoly
 Wan Mohd Azam Bin Wan Ishak
 Wan Zahari Bin Wan Ismail
 Zulkeflee Bin Husin

Front of House

 Abdul Malik Bin Osman
 Ahmad Jamri Bin Jamaluddin
 Aniza Bt. Baharom
 Azman Bin Abu Bakar
 Azrita Aida Bt. Abdul Aziz
 Boniface Anak Babai
 Fauziah Hanim Bt. Mohd. Zain
 Halimattun Bt. Mohd Nor
 Hamdan Bin Awang
 Hanipah Bt. Hairi
 Hasnul Bin Hassan
 Jailani Bin Abdul Razak
 Marina Mary Charles
 Md Firdaus Bin Alias
 Mohamad Nizam Bin Elias
 Mohd Aizat Bin Rusly
 Norhashimah Bt. Leman
 Nor Haslinda Bt. Abdul Manaf
 Nor Zulzaliana Bt. Yahya
 Nurul Wahida Bt. Zulkifli
 Roslinah Bt. Haroun
 Roszilawati Bt. Abd Rahim
 Rudy De Luna Jr
 Saniah Bt. Aziz
 Siti Norhabsah Bt. Syeikh Ahmad
 Siti Sarah Bt. Abdul Kalam
 Syaira Dalina Bt. Abdullah
 Zamri Bin Mohamad

Footnotes
 Note 1:  Siti might have misnamed the name of the singing competition and later was misquoted by the media. Siti actually won the Gold Award from the Asia New Singer Competition and not the Golden Voice Singing Competition as reported by Kemalia Othman of mStar and several other news outlets.
 Note 2:  When Adnan Abu Hassan accompanied Siti on stage, he played the piano for "Jerat Percintaan" and "Gelora Asmara" and not "Jerat Percintaan" and "Azimat Cinta".

Explanatory notes

References

Further reading
 Konsert Unplugged 20 Tahun Siti Nurhaliza (Siti Nurhaliza's 20 Years Unplugged Concert) Abdul Mursyid Zainuddin. Suara TV (March 24, 2015). 

2015 in music
Siti Nurhaliza